The Glasgow and South Western Railway (GSWR) 9 class is a class of seven 0-4-2 steam locomotives designed in 1857, as an enlarged version of the 105 class.

Development 
The seven examples of this class were designed by Patrick Stirling for the GSWR and were built by Neilson and Company (Works Nos. 398-404) between November  and December 1857. They were numbered 9, 14, 15, 17, 20, 30, and 33.
The  members of the class were fitted with domed boilers and safety valves over the firebox.

Withdrawal 
No 174 was withdrawn after an accident at Dalbeattie in 1874, and No.20 suffered a boiler explosion at Springhill, Glasgow in March 1876. The remainder were withdrawn by James Stirling between 1874 and 1876.

References 

009
Standard gauge steam locomotives of Great Britain
Railway locomotives introduced in 1857